Wattle Grove is a rural locality in the South Burnett Region, Queensland, Australia. In the  Wattle Grove had a population of 86 people.

History 
Wattle Grove State School opened on 17 May 1915 and closed on 31 December 1963.

In the  Wattle Grove had a population of 86 people.

References 

South Burnett Region
Localities in Queensland